Prisons in Iceland are few and generally low security.

Current

Former

External links
State Prison Administration 

 
Iceland
Prisons